The Lindsay Society is a constituent society of the British Dental Association dedicated to the study of the history of dentistry.

Origins 
The Lindsay Club was formed in 1962, the idea of dental surgeon J. E. McAuley. He was inspired by the Osler Club, a society for those interested in the history of medicine, of which he was a member. The new club was intended to perform the same function for the history of dentistry and was named after Lilian Lindsay, the first woman to qualify as a dentist in the UK and a president of the British Dental Association. The first meeting of the Lindsay Club was held in October 1962, two years after Lindsay's death. At a later date the club was renamed The Lindsay Society.

Meetings 
The Lindsay Society holds meetings at the British Dental Association headquarters in Wimpole Street, London and an annual meeting each year usually in the home town of the current president. There is an annual Lilian Lindsay memorial lecture each year at annual British Dental Association conference. The society is affiliated to the British Society for the History of Medicine.

Dental Historian 
The society publishes the Dental Historian twice yearly in January and July which contains articles related to the history of dentistry.

Chairmen and presidents
The following persons have been chairmen/president of the society:

References 

Dental organizations
Organizations established in 1962
History of dentistry